Sayyid Abdullah bin Muhammad Ridha Al Shubbar al-Husayni al-Kazemi (1188 AH – 1242 AH), was an Iraqi Twelver Shia scholar, cleric, speaker, jurist and interpreter of the Quran, famous for his book in exegesis of the Qur'an Tafsir Shobar and also his book Al-Akhlaq (The Moral). He was active in Islamic sciences such as jurisprudence, fundamentals, hadith, interpretation, philosophy, language, literature and history.

Early life and education 
His family Al Shobar was one of the ancient houses of knowledge in Hillah, Iraq. His family moved to city of Najaf to Seeking Religious knowledge.
He was born in 1188 AH in Najaf (1774-1775 AD) then he moved to city of Kadhimiya and settled in it.

His Teachers 
His father Sayyid Muhammad Redha and Sayyid Muhsin al-Araji al-Kazimi. 
He get ijtihad from Sheikh  and Shaykh Ahmed bin Zain al-Din al-Ahsaei.

His lineage 
His lineage goes to the 4th Shiite Imam, Zayn al-'Abidin.

Abdullah bin Muhammad Ridha bin Shubar bin Hassan bin Ahmed bin Ali bin Ahmed bin Nasser al-Din bin Shams al-Din Muhammad bin Najm al-Din bin Hassan bin Muhammad bin Hamza bin Ahmed bin Ali bin Talha bin Hussein bin Ali bin Omar bin Hassan Al-Aftas bin Ali bin Zain Al-Abidin Ali bin Al-Hussein bin Ali bin Abi Talib.

Jurisprudence 
He was one of opponents of the Akhbari school in that era In defense of Usuli school through his books that he wrote in jurisprudence.

In the Views of the Scholars 

 Abbas Qomi referred to him in his book Al-Kuna wa al-Alqab "as a keen knowledgeable scholar and high-ranking scholar of hadiths".
 Al-Sayyed Mohsen al-Amin referred to him in his book Ayan al-Shia : "His conditions is muhadith (expert in science of hadith), He is the author of a lot of writing and authoring". Also in the book he referred to the writings of contemporaries and those familiar with his books whose referred to him such as the author of Dar al-Salaam and Sheikh Abd al-Nabi al-Kazimi (the author of Takmilat al-Rijal) student of Sayyid Abdullah Shubbar .

Works 
He wrote many books. it about 70 book in about a hundred volumes, which is why he came to be known as "the second Majlisi"

And the most prominent of his books:

 Tafsir Shobar (Quran commentary).
 Al Akhalq (The Moral).
 Al jawhar al Thamin fi Sharh al Kitab al Mubin - 6 parts (Quran commentary).
 Teb al Aema (Islamic issues).
 Irshad al Mustabsir fi al Estekharat (Dua).
 Al Slook ela Allah (Ethics and Irfan)
 Haq al Yaqeen fi Marefat Usul al Deen (Islamic theology)
 Ahsan al Taqweem (Dua).
 Al Anwar al Lamea fi Sharh al Ziara al Jamia (Dua).
 Nukhbat al Sharhin fi Sharh Nahj al Balagha (Hadith).
 Sharh al Mahaga fi Sharh Khutbat al Luma (Sermon explanation of Fatima al Zahraa) (Hadith).

Death 
He died At the age of fifty-four years In the year 1242 AH (1826 - 1827 AD). He was burial in a chamber in the Shrine of Kadhimiya in the city of Kadhimiya next to his father Sayyid Muhammad Reda.

References

External links 
مجلسى ثانى و كتاب درايه او - مجلسی ثانی و کتاب درایه او نسخه متنی
الشُبَّرُ محدّثاً
ترجمة المؤلف‏ السيد عبد الله شبر
السيّد عبدالله شُبّر || شبكة الإمام الرضا عليه السلام
Al-Sayyid 'Abd Allah Shubbar

Iraqi Shia clerics
People from Najaf
Shia scholars of Islam
1774 births
1827 deaths